Ambidexter may refer to:
Ambidexterity, the state of being equally adept in the use of both left and right appendages, usually the hands
Ambidexter (horse), a British thoroughbred horse
Ambidexter (genus), a type of shrimp in family Processidae